The Monastery of the Temptation (Monastḗri tou Peirasmoú; , Deir al-Quruntul) is a Greek Orthodox monastery located in Jericho, Palestine. It was built on the slopes of the Mount of Temptation 350 meters above sea level, situated along a cliff overlooking the city of Jericho and the Jordan Valley. Its most ancient structures date back to the 6th century, having been built above the cave traditionally said to be that where Jesus spent forty days and forty nights fasting and meditating while he was tempted by Satan.

It currently serves as a tourist attraction and its land is under the full jurisdiction of the Palestinian National Authority, while the monastery is owned and managed by the Greek Orthodox Patriarchate of Jerusalem.

History

Hellenistic period
A fortress built by the Seleucids called "Doq" stood at the summit of the mountain. It was captured by the Hasmoneans and it was here that Simon Maccabaeus was murdered by his son-in-law Ptolemy.

Byzantine period
The earliest monastery was constructed by the Byzantines in the 6th century CE above the cave traditionally said to be that where Jesus spent forty days and forty nights fasting and meditating during the temptation of Satan, about three kilometers northwest of Jericho. The monastery receives its name from the mountain which the early Christians referred to as the "Mount of the Temptation". The Mount of Temptation was identified by Augusta Helena of Constantinople as one of the "holy sites" in her pilgrimage in 326 CE.

Early Muslim period
Palestine, including Jericho, was conquered by the Arabs under the Islamic Caliphate of Umar ibn al-Khattab in the 630s.

Crusader period
When the Crusaders conquered the area in 1099, they built two churches on the site: one in a cave halfway up the cliff and a second on the summit. They referred to the site as Mons Quarantana (compare with quarante in modern French and quaranta in modern Italian, both meaning forty, the number of days in the Gospel account of Jesus's fast).

Late Ottoman period
The land upon which the modern monastery was built was purchased by the Orthodox Church in 1874. In 1895, the monastery was constructed around a crude cave chapel that marks the stone where Jesus sat during his fast. 

The Orthodox Church, along with its Palestinian Orthodox followers purchaser, originally attempted to build a church at the summit, but were unsuccessful; the unfinished walls of that church are located on a slope above the monastery.

Palestinian Authority 
In 1998, a cable car was built from Jericho's Tell es-Sultan to the level of the monastery by an Austrian-Swiss company as a tourist attraction for the year 2000. 

As of 2002, three Orthodox monks were dwelling in the monastery and were guiding visitors to the site. 

At present there is a restaurant, a café, and a souvenir shop at the monastery entrance for the tourists.

See also
Hisham's Palace
Mar Saba

References

Bibliography

 (pp.  201-3)
  (pp. 41-5)
Jacobs, Daniel. Eber, Shirley. (1998) Israel and the Palestinian Territories Rough Guides. 
Lee, Risha Kim. (2002) Let's Go 2003 Israel and the Palestinian territories Let's Go Incorporate. 
 (pp. 252-258)

External links
Monastery of the Temptation , seetheholyland.net
Survey of Western Palestine, Map 18:   IAA, Wikimedia commons

Greek Orthodoxy in the State of Palestine
Churches completed in 1895
Greek Orthodox monasteries
Christian monasteries in the West Bank
19th-century Christian monasteries
Buildings and structures in Jericho
6th-century religious buildings and structures
6th-century establishments in Asia
Temptation of Christ